Waverley Bridge is a road bridge in Edinburgh linking Market Street in the Old Town with Princes Street in the New Town. The bridge forms part of the roof of Edinburgh Waverley station and marks the eastern boundary of Princes Street Gardens. The current bridge was built between 1894 and 1896 by Blyth and Westland; it is Category A listed.

Location 

Situated at the east end of Princes Street Gardens, Waverley Bridge is one of three parallel roads crossing the former Nor Loch valley and linking Edinburgh's historic Old and New towns. To the west of Waverley Bridge lies The Mound, which links Princes Street in the New Town with the western end of Market Street in the Old Town. To the east, running above the Waverley Station roof, is North Bridge, which links the east end of Princes Street with the High Street and South Bridge. 

Two ramps lead down from Waverley bridge into the centre of the station. Since January 2014 car and taxi access to the station has been banned, with the ramps now largely dedicated to foot traffic and delivery access.

Halfway across the bridge, on the eastern side, is the station's Category A listed former parcels office. The structure was converted into a restaurant in the 1980s and is now in operation as a public house. At the northeast corner of the bridge, at the junction with Princes Street, is the Waverley Market shopping centre. There is a Transport for Edinburgh Travelshop at the south end of the bridge, at the corner with Market Street and Cockburn Street, which runs up to the High Street.

Buses 
Lothian Buses' Airlink 100 service to Edinburgh Airport begins and terminates at stop WA on Waverley Bridge. Edinburgh Bus Tour routes call at stop WB on the bridge.

References 

 

Bridges in Edinburgh
Streets in Edinburgh
Category A listed buildings in Edinburgh
Listed bridges in Scotland
Road bridges in Scotland
Bridges completed in 1896
1896 establishments in Scotland